is a former Japanese football player. He is the twin brother of Masashi Otani.

Playing career
Otani was born in Isesaki on April 17, 1983. After graduating from high school, he joined J1 League club FC Tokyo in 2002. However he could not play at all in the match. In June 2004, he moved to Japan Football League club Thespa Kusatsu. He became a regular player as defensive midfielder soon. Although he was injured in late in 2004, Thespa was promoted to J2 League end of 2004 season. However he could not play at all in the match for rehabilitation in 2005. Although he came back in 2006, he could hardly play in the match and retired end of 2006 season.

Club statistics

References

External links

1983 births
Living people
Association football people from Gunma Prefecture
Japanese footballers
J1 League players
J2 League players
Japan Football League players
FC Tokyo players
Thespakusatsu Gunma players
Twin sportspeople
Japanese twins
Association football midfielders